Surf Life Saving may refer to:

 Surf lifesaving, voluntary lifeguard services and competitive surf sport
 Surf Life Saving Australia, a not-for-profit community organisation
 Surf Life Saving New Zealand, a national association 
 Surf Life Saving Association of Wales

See also
 Lifeguard
 Surf Life Saving Club, a volunteer institution at Australia's beaches